Devadhar Government Higher Secondary School is a State Government owned Higher Secondary School located in K Puram, near Tanur in Malappuram district of Kerala State. It is run by Department of General Education and Department of Higher Secondary Education of Government of Kerala. It has two sections. Oldest, started in 1919, works under Department of General Education catering classes from Five to Ten and latest under Department of Higher Secondary Education holds 11 & 12. Higher Secondary Sections were started in 1990.

The School is situated in Tanalur Grama Panchayath. Tanur is the nearest town. It is located in between Tirur and Tanur, some 13 km from Tirur and 4 km from Tanur. Shoranur–Mangalore railway line of Indian Railways literally passes through the school premises.

Campus

Devadhar Govt Higher Secondary School is situated between Tirur & Tanur on the State Highway connecting Ponnani with Feroke in Malappuram Dist. Tanur (Indian Railways Code TA) is the nearest railway station, which falls in Shoranur–Mangalore electrified double line of Southern Railway. Tirur railway station (Code TIR) also serves as the most of trains stop here than Tanur. Calicut International Airport at Karippur is the nearest airport located at a distance of about 30 km. The school can be reached easily from Tirur Bus Station, boarding buses to Tanur, Parappanangadi, Kadalundi, Chaliyam-bound buses. You can alight at Devadhar Bus Stop just before reaching Tanur Bus Station.

See also
 Education in India

References

External links
Facebook

Schools in Kerala
Educational institutions established in 1952
1952 establishments in India